Girl in 313 is a 1940 American drama film directed by Ricardo Cortez and written by Barry Trivers and M. Clay Adams. The film stars Florence Rice, Kent Taylor, Lionel Atwill, Kay Aldridge, Mary Treen and Jack Carson. The film was released on May 31, 1940, by 20th Century Fox.

Plot
Police agent Joan Matthews goes undercover in a gang of jewel thieves and when about to find who the evildoers are, she falls in love with one of the thieves.

Cast 
Florence Rice as Joan Matthews
Kent Taylor as Gregg Dunn
Lionel Atwill as Russell aka Henry Woodruff
Kay Aldridge as Sarah Sorrell 
Mary Treen as Jenny
Jack Carson as Police Lt. Pat O'Farrell
Elyse Knox as Judith Wilson
Joan Valerie as Francine Edwards
Dorothy Dearing as Emmy Lou Bentley
Dorothy Moore as Happy 
Julie Bishop as Lorna Hobart
Charles C. Wilson as Vincent Brady
William B. Davidson as George Grayson
Lenita Lane as Mrs. Whitman
Lillian Porter as Page Girl
Alice Armand as Clerk
Gladys Costello as Assistant Clerk
Adrian Morris as First Detective
Lee Phelps as Second Detective
Charles Williams as Henry 
Evalyn Knapp as Arrested Girl
Pat O'Malley as Bartender
James Flavin as Det. Carvin 
Ralph Dunn as Det. Berner
Eddy Chandler as Cop
Rex Evans as Corday
Iris Wong as Chinese Model
Laura Treadwell as Mrs. Jamison
Grace Hayle as Mrs. Hudson
Edward Cooper as Butler
Billy Wayne as Cab Driver
Mantan Moreland as Porter
Iva Stewart as Margie
Florence Wright as Secretary

References

External links 
 

1940 films
20th Century Fox films
American drama films
1940 drama films
American black-and-white films
Films directed by Ricardo Cortez
1940s English-language films
1940s American films